
Gmina Dywity is a rural gmina (administrative district) in Olsztyn County, Warmian-Masurian Voivodeship, in northern Poland.

Villages
Gmina Dywity contains the villages and settlements of Barkweda, Brąswałd, Bukwałd, Dąbrówka Wielka, Dywity, Frączki, Gady, Gradki, Kieźliny, Ługwałd, Myki, Nowe Włóki, Plutki, Redykajny, Rozgity, Różnowo, Sętal, Słupy, Spręcowo, Tuławki, Wadąg and Zalbki.

Neighbouring gminas
Gmina Dywity is bordered by the city of Olsztyn and by the gminas of Barczewo, Dobre Miasto, Jeziorany, Jonkowo and Świątki.

References
Polish official population figures 2006

Dywity
Olsztyn County